The Church ruins in Mazrek, Shkodër County, Albania, are a Cultural Monument of Albania.

References

Cultural Monuments of Albania
Buildings and structures in Shkodër
Church ruins in Albania